Marnock or Marnock of Kilmarnock (died  AD 625), also known as Marnan of Narnach, Marnanus, Marnocalso or originally Ernin was a Scottish monk, bishop and  saint.

Biography
Details on the life of Marnock that have survived to the present day are limited, though some facts are known. Marnock was born in Ireland, most likely in the late 6th century. He became a monk on the abbey at Iona where he became a student and disciple of Columba. He later left the monastery to become a missionary bishop on the Scottish mainland.

It is widely accepted that Marnock died at Annandale in 625, however at least one account gives his place of death and burial site as Inchmarnoch near Aboyne in Aberdeenshire.

Veneration and legacy

A strong cult of veneration developed for Marnock after his death, particularly in the region of the Scottish Borders. Marnock's head was kept as a relic at Kilmarnock, where a tradition emerged where it was washed each Sunday, with the resulting wash water given to the sick to effect miraculous cures.

The strength of Marnock's cult in the centuries that followed his death is demonstrated in the great number of locations, in Scotland as well as in Ireland, named in his honour, including: 

 Ardmonoch, a locality within Kilfinan in Argyll and Bute
 Dalmarnock a district within Glasgow
 Dalmarnock, a farmsteading near Dunkeld, and the adjacent Dalmarnock Beat, a salmon fishery on the River Tay
 Inchmarnoch, an island on the River Dee in Aberdeenshire where Marnock established a chapel and, by some accounts, died and was buried
 Inchmarnock, an isle at the northern end of the Sound of Bute
 Kilmarnock, a town in Ayrshire 
 Portmarnock, a coastal hamlet in Fingal, Ireland
 Naomh Mearnóg CLG, a GAA club in Portmarnock
 Marnoch, a parish in Aberdeenshire
 Marnock Oil Field, at the centre of the Eastern Trough Area Project, 150 miles east of Aberdeen under the North Sea.

References

Scottish Roman Catholic saints
Medieval Irish saints
Medieval Scottish saints
Irish Roman Catholic saints
6th-century Christian saints
7th-century Christian saints
625 deaths
Year of birth unknown
Christian_missionaries_in_Scotland